Olav Haukvik (26 June 1928 – 22 February 1992) was a Norwegian politician for the Labour Party. He served as the county governor of Telemark from 1973-1976. He then served as Minister of Industry from 1978–1979.

References

1928 births
1992 deaths
Government ministers of Norway
County governors of Norway
Ministers of Trade and Shipping of Norway